The 2016 New Hampshire 301 was a NASCAR Sprint Cup Series stock car race held on July 17, 2016 at New Hampshire Motor Speedway in Loudon, New Hampshire. Contested over 301 laps on the  speedway, it was the 19th race of the 2016 NASCAR Sprint Cup Series. Matt Kenseth won the race, his second win of the season, and Tony Stewart finished second. Joey Logano, Kevin Harvick and Greg Biffle rounded out the top five. The race had 13 lead changes among 8 drivers and seven cautions for 36 laps.

Report

Background

New Hampshire Motor Speedway is a  oval speedway located in Loudon, New Hampshire, which has hosted NASCAR racing annually since the early 1990s, as well as the longest-running motorcycle race in North America, the Loudon Classic. Nicknamed "The Magic Mile", the speedway is often converted into a  road course, which includes much of the oval.

The track was originally the site of Bryar Motorsports Park before being purchased and redeveloped by Bob Bahre. The track is currently one of eight major NASCAR tracks owned and operated by Speedway Motorsports.

Entry list
The preliminary entry list for the race included 40 cars and was released on July 11, 2016 at 10:12 a.m. Eastern time. Among the changes is Alex Bowman subbing for Dale Earnhardt Jr. who'll sit out this race due to concussion symptoms.

First practice

Qualifying

He said afterwards that his car "had a really weird set of tires or something odd go on on our mock run at the end of practice," Johnson said. "It felt like something was broken on the car. So to come back and have good speed in the car and advance, I knew after round two we would have a shot at the pole, because we were able to keep our lap count down and advance to the next round on our first lap in each session. And then put together a smooth lap. I felt like it could have been faster, but certainly a good smooth one, and it was enough." He commented further that he has "had, as everybody knows, a tough month or two. To be back in the media center is a nice feeling. I even forgot that I had to come here. It’s amazing how fast things change." He also added that qualifying at New Hampshire is important because it's "the most important track for track position. It’s a short race, very difficult to pass. You need track position. The key is to keep it, but at least we’re starting with it.”

Kyle Busch, who qualified second, said his "car wasn’t quite as good as I had hoped it would be as far as the feeling that I had with grip. It was fast though, the second round and third round were certainly high up there on the speed charts, but just didn’t quite have the comfort that I was looking for out of the car to be able to push it a little bit more and get some more time out of it, actually had to give up a little time because of the lack of grip that I felt off the exit of four and ended up p2 today.”

Qualifying results

Practice (post-qualifying)

Second practice

Final practice

Race

First half
Under mostly sunny New Hampshire skies, Jimmie Johnson led the field to the green flag at 1:41 p.m. Kyle Busch and Kurt Busch tried to pass Johnson exiting turn 4, but Johnson edged ahead and led the first lap. Kyle got right beside him exiting turn 4 and edged him to the line to lead the second lap. By lap 30, he held a three-second lead over Johnson. By lap 35, Johnson fell from second to fourth. The first caution of the race flew on lap 36. It was a scheduled competition caution for overnight rain.

The race restarted on lap 41. After 20 laps, his lead was half a second over Martin Truex Jr. By lap 80, the gap shrunk to four-tenths of a second. By lap 81, Truex closed up to his rear bumper. After working on Kyle for seven laps, Truex took the lead on lap 89. After 10 laps, Kyle fell from second to fifth. The second caution of the race flew on lap 100 for a single-car spin on the backstretch. Exiting turn 2, Chris Buescher got loose, slammed on the brakes to avoid slamming Josh Wise – but hit him anyway – and spun down the track. Wise went on to finish 40th.

The race restarted on lap 109. By lap 120, his lead grew to three seconds over Kurt Busch. By lap 140, the lead shrunk to 1.3 seconds. By lap 173, Kyle reeled in Truex and passed him in turn 1 to retake the lead. Truex didn't give up and stayed close to Kyle to try and pounce on him for the lead. A number of cars began making green flag stops on lap 181. Kyle hit pit road on lap 183 and handed the lead to Brad Keselowski. He pitted the next lap and the lead cycled back to Kyle. Ryan Blaney was tagged for speeding on pit road and was forced to serve a pass through penalty.

Second half

Debris in turn 3 brought out the third caution of the race with 80 laps to go. Truex exited pit road with the race lead. A. J. Allmendinger was tagged for his crew being over the wall too soon and restarted the race from the tail-end of the field.

The race restarted with 74 laps to go. He was unable to pull away from the field as Matt Kenseth pulled up to him looking for the lead. He spent the next 30 laps tailing Truex until he got to his inside exiting turn 4 and took the lead with 44 laps to go. Debris in turn 3 brought out the fourth caution of the race with 36 laps to go. Denny Hamlin opted not to pit under the caution and assumed the lead. During the caution, Truex reported that his shifter had broken and that he had no clutch.

The race restarted with 33 laps to go. Truex's car, being stuck in fourth gear, stalled on the restart and caused a log jam with cars swerving to avoid him, which led to a number of cars making contact with one another. Kenseth worked on Hamlin for a number of laps before retaking the lead with 30 laps to go. The fifth caution of the race flew with 29 laps to go for a two-car wreck on the frontstretch. Entering turn 1, Alex Bowman – subbing for the injured Dale Earnhardt Jr. – suffered a tire blowout and slammed the wall. Chase Elliott also suffered a tire blowout, but avoided the wall. Bowman said after the race that he thought Edwards "was backing up because he was blocked in as I was leaving the pit box. My left-rear hit his right-rear as I was leaving. It caved it in enough, we thought we would be fine, but obviously, when I got into (Kurt Busch) it was already going down. They knew we were here for sure and I had a blast.” He added that what happened was "really unfortunate — the worst we would have finished was about seventh or eighth. I hate the circumstances obviously, and I hope Dale Jr. is feeling better, but we had a top-10 car all day long.”

The race restarted with 24 laps to go and a number of cars made contact on the restart, notably the No. 41 of Kurt Busch. Three laps later, he suffered a left-rear tire blowout and hit the wall. Brad Keselowski also suffered a tire blowout.

The race restarted with 17 laps to go. A three-car wreck on the backstretch brought out the sixth caution of the race. It started with Ryan Newman made contact with Carl Edwards. He turned down into Kasey Kahne who turned up into Kyle Larson who turned down through the grass.

The race restarted with 11 laps to go and Kenseth drove on to score the victory.

Post-race

Driver comments
Kenseth said in victory lane that a driver is "always pleased to be in victory lane. The farther down the road you get, the better they feel for sure. Thanks to everybody at Joe Gibbs Racing. I’ve said it a million times, but I’m blessed with this opportunity to be over here with the guys I get to work with and my great sponsors, Dollar General and of course, can’t do it without Toyota, TRD (Toyota Racing Development), Interstate Batteries, WileyX, Gatorade. Jason (Ratcliff, crew chief) and the team over there made great, great adjustments today. I didn’t do a very good job qualifying and after round one today it was pretty much money, we just had to get there. It was a fun day.”

After a runner-up finish, Stewart said his crew chief "is doing a great job on the box. You can see the confidence not only in him, but all the guys on the team. Our Chevys are fast right now. I feel like we are gaining on it. What we said, I don't know when we said it, we were talking about you crawl before you walk, walk before you run, run before you jog and job before you sprint. We are definitely running right now. I feel like we are getting pretty close to this sprint at the end."

After edging out Harvick at the line for third, Logano said he would "take a third place after all that. We were awful at the beginning of the race. We tried some new things and apparently they didn’t work so we aborted mission in the middle of the race and got some speed back in the 22 but not enough to beat the 20.”

"We under-execute as a team on a weekly basis and got to do a better job," an unhappy Harvick said after finishing fourth. "The ... cars are always fast, but we always do something wrong. It's really going to have to come from the top [to manage]. I mean they are going to have to clamp down and there is no way we can win a championship like this unless they straighten some of this stuff out."

Penalties
Kenseth was issued a penalty on the Wednesday following the race for failing post-race inspection. He was docked 15 driver points, crew chief Jason Ratcliff was issued a 25-thousand dollar fine and placed on probation through December 31.

Race results

Race summary
 13 lead changes among 8 drivers
 7 cautions for 36 laps
 0 red flags
 Time of race: 2 hours, 57 minutes and 53 seconds
 Average speed:

Media

Television
NBC Sports covered the race on the television side. Rick Allen, four-time and all-time Loudon winner Jeff Burton and Steve Letarte had the call in the booth for the race. Dave Burns, Mike Massaro, Marty Snider and Kelli Stavast reported from pit lane during the race.

Radio
PRN had the radio call for the race, which was simulcast on Sirius XM NASCAR Radio.

Standings after the race

Note: Only the first 16 positions are included for the driver standings.. – Driver has clinched a position in the Chase for the Sprint Cup.

References

2016 in sports in New Hampshire
2016 NASCAR Sprint Cup Series
2016 New Hampshire 301
July 2016 sports events in the United States